Mount Speed is a roughly circular, mound-shaped mountain with several low summits at the edge of Ross Ice Shelf, standing at the west side of the mouth of Shackleton Glacier. Discovered by the United States Antarctic Service Expedition (USAS) (1939–41), and surveyed by A.P. Crary, leader of the U.S. Ross Ice Shelf Traverse (1957–58). Named by Crary for Lieutenant Harvey G. Speed, U.S. Navy, Squadron VX-6, who wintered at Little America V in 1957.

Mountains of the Ross Dependency
Dufek Coast